Bennett, Coleman and Company Limited, (abbreviated as B.C.C.L. and d/b/a The Times Group), is an Indian media conglomerate headquartered in Mumbai, Maharashtra. The company remains a family-owned business with Sahu Jain family owning a majority stake in The Times Group.

History 
On 3 November 1838, the Bombay Times and Journal of Commerce was first published, a predecessor of what would become The Times of India. While starting as a biweekly paper, it was converted to a daily in 1850. In 1859 the paper was merged with two other papers into the Bombay Times and Standard under editor Robert Knight. Two years later, in 1861, the paper got a more national scope with the title The Times of India. Subsequently the paper saw its ownership change several times until 1892 when an English journalist named Thomas Jewell Bennett along with Frank Morris Coleman (who later drowned in the 1915 sinking of the SS Persia) acquired the newspaper through their new joint stock company, Bennett, Coleman & Co. Ltd. (BCCL).  At the time, some 800 people were employed by the paper.

The company, by that time consolidated in the Times of India Group, was taken over from its British owners in 1946 by industrialist Ramkrishna Dalmia.

Ramkrishna Dalmia (7 April 1893 – 26 September 1978) was a pioneer industrialist and founder of the Dalmia-Jain group or Dalmia Group and The Times Group. The name is variously written as Ram Krishan Dalmia and Ram Kishan Dalmia. In 1947, Dalmia engineered the acquisition of the media giant Bennett, Coleman by transferring monies from a bank and an insurance company of which he was the Chairman. In 1955, this came to the attention of the socialist parliamentarian Feroze Gandhi who was part of the ruling Congress party headed by his estranged father-in-law Jawaharlal Nehru. In December 1955, he raised the matter in the Parliament, documenting extensively the various fund transfers and intermediaries through which the acquisition had been financed. The case was investigated by the Vivian Bose Commission of Inquiry.

In the court case that followed, where he was represented by the leading British attorney Sir Dingle Mackintosh Foot, he was sentenced to two years in Tihar Jail. But for most of the jail term he managed to spend in hospital. Upon his release his son-in-law Sahu Shanti Prasad Jain to whom he had entrusted running of Bennett, Coleman & Co. Ltd. rebuffed his efforts to resume command of the company.

During his time in prison the company was run by his son-in-law Sahu Shanti Prasad Jain. Jain would buy the company a few years later and the company would be primarily run by his family in the years after. The company expanded its presence in the Indian media sphere by founding different papers and local editions of The Times of India.

Decline and revival

The Times of India press published a number of influential English (e.g. Illustrated Weekly of India 1880-1993) and Hindi magazines (e.g. Dharmyug 1949-1997, Sarika, Dinaman 1965-1990s, Parag 1958-1990s), edited by distinguished authors including Khushwant Singh, Dharmveer Bharti, Agyeya and Sarveshwar Dayal Saxena. However, the organisation faced financial difficulties, and most of them were closed down during the 1990s.

The sons of Sahu Ashok Jain, Sahu Samir Jain and Vineet Jain are credited with reviving the financial success of the group with newer and more profitable ventures.

Assets

Publications
 The Times of India, largest circulation of any English-language newspaper in the world, with 2.8 million copies.
 The Economic Times
 Navbharat Times
 Maharashtra Times
 Ei Samay
 Mumbai Mirror
 Vijaya Karnataka

Television channels 
The Times Group owns the following channels.

Times Business Solutions Limited 

Times Business Solutions – A division of Times Internet Limited is a limited company, wholly owned by Bennett Coleman Company Limited (The Times Group). TBS develops web sites within areas such as recruitment, real estate and matrimonials such as SimplyMarry.com.

TBS started as a division of BCCL in 2004 to create an exchange for job seekers and employers on the internet. With the growth of internet attaining rapid speed and being a highly profitable venture, Times Business Solutions – A division of Times Internet Limited was born as the "Internet Initiatives" of BCCL. Times Group, others put $20 million into [[Square Yards ]] in Sep 2019.

Times Internet

Times Internet is an Indian company which owns, operates and invests in various Internet-led products, services and technology.

Radio Mirchi

Radio Mirchi is a nationwide network of private FM radio stations in India.

See also 
 Publications of The Times Group

References

Further reading

External links

 

 
Radio broadcasting companies of India
Newspaper companies of India
Companies based in Mumbai
Publishing companies established in 1838
1838 establishments in British India
British companies established in 1838
Indian brands
.
Entertainment companies of India
Film production companies based in Mumbai
Television broadcasting companies of India
Television production companies of India
Television stations in Mumbai
Entertainment companies established in 1838
Television networks in India
Television stations in Delhi
Television stations in New Delhi
Mass media companies based in Mumbai
Mass media companies established in 1838